The 1993–94 UEFA Champions League knockout stage began on 27 April with the semi-finals and ended on 18 May 1994 with the final at the Olympic Stadium in Athens, Greece, to decide the champions of the 1993–94 UEFA Champions League. A total of four teams competed in the knockout stage.

Times are CEST (UTC+2), as listed by UEFA.

Qualified teams
The knockout stage involved the four teams which qualified as winners and runners-up of both groups in the group stage.

Format
Each tie in the knockout stage was played in a single match. For the semi-finals, the group winners played at home against the runner-up of the other group. If the score was level at the end of normal time, extra time would be played, followed by a penalty shoot-out if the score was still level.

Schedule
The schedule was as follows.

Bracket

Semi-finals

Summary

The matches were played on 27 April 1994.

|}

Matches

Final

The final was played on 18 May 1994 at the Olympic Stadium in Athens.

References

External links

Knockout stage
1993-94
April 1994 sports events in Europe
May 1994 sports events in Europe